Heckington Methodist Church is in Heckington, Lincolnshire, England.

History

The first Wesleyan Methodist chapel in the village was built in 1809, but this was replaced by a new chapel in Saint Andrew's Street in 1835.

The building of the current church started in 1904 to designs by Nottingham-based architect Albert Edward Lambert. It cost around £2,250. and was constructed by T. Barlow and Co. of Nottingham.

Current
The church is part of the Sleaford circuit and holds a service at 10:30 every Sunday.  There are many social activities which use the church.

References

Churches completed in 1905
Gothic Revival church buildings in England
Gothic Revival architecture in Lincolnshire
Methodist churches in Lincolnshire
Albert Edward Lambert buildings
1809 establishments in England